King Arthur and the Knights of the Round Table can refer to:

The legend of King Arthur and the Knights of the Round Table
King Arthur and the Knights of the Round Table, a 2017 movie.
King Arthur & the Knights of the Round Table, or simply King Arthur (TV series), a 1979 Japanese anime series
King Arthur and the Knights of the Round Table, an alternate title for Howard Pyle's The Story of King Arthur and His Knights
King Arthur and the Knights of the Round Table, a non-fiction book by Anne Berthelot
The Myths and Legends of King Arthur and the Knights of the Round Table, an album by Rick Wakeman